Rayapati Sambasiva Rao is an Indian politician and a member of the 11th, 12th, 14th, 15th, and 16th Lok Sabha. He was one of the youngest members to be elected to the Rajya Sabha at the age of 39. He represented the Narasaraopet and Guntur parliamentary constituency of Andhra Pradesh and currently is a member of the Telugu Desam Party.

Early life 
Rao was born in Unguturu, Guntur district, Andhra Pradesh. His father, Venkata Ranga Rao, was a farmer and a follower of Shaivism. His mother, Sitaramamma was a housewife. Sambasivarao was eldest of the seven children. He completed his Secondary Education from Tadikonda and graduated from New Science College, Hyderabad.

Politics
He was inspired by the Indian National Congress, led by then-Prime Minister Indira Gandhi and his maternal uncle Gogineni Kanakaiah, who was also a prominent politician. He served as Sarpanch and President Panchayat Samithi, Tadikonda. He was elected as a member of the Rajya Sabha, and later elected to Lok Sabha for five terms.

Bank fraud case
Sambasiva Rao is the prime accused in transstroy bank fraud case to the tune of 7926Cr Rupees. According to the chargesheet filed by Central Bureau of Investigation (CBI), Sambasiva Rao created fake companies in the name of his maids, drivers and sweepers for diversion of funds from Banks.

Personal life
Sambasiva Rao is married to Leela Kumari. They have one son, Rayapati Ranga Rao and two daughters Devika Rani and Lakshmi.

References

External links

Telugu Desam Party politicians
Indian National Congress politicians from Andhra Pradesh
1943 births
Living people
India MPs 2004–2009
India MPs 2009–2014
India MPs 2014–2019
India MPs 1996–1997
India MPs 1998–1999
Telugu politicians
Lok Sabha members from Andhra Pradesh
People from Guntur district
Bharatiya Janata Party politicians from Andhra Pradesh